Reggie Knighton is an American singer, songwriter and lead guitarist from Biloxi, Mississippi who relocated to Los Angeles, California at an early age and grew up there.

Career 
His professional career started as the lead guitarist for The Grass Roots from 1974 to 1975. He arranged an audition through Dennis Provisor who had experience with the group since 1969. He played lead guitar during the period of The Grass Roots "Mamacita" single (which charted), their self titled album and the US tour in support of it. He played with Rob Grill (lead vocals and bass), Dennis Provisor (vocals and keyboards) and Joel Larson (drums).

He then worked with John Sebastian on his very popular "Welcome Back" album, the #1 single released and the US tour in support of it in 1976. After that whirlwind experience with a gifted talent like Sebastian, he then played with a band called White Horse in 1977.

Later in 1977, he produced 4-track demos of his compositions in his own home studio. The tapes caught the ear of a management company, which landed him a record deal with CBS Records. He released his self titled solo album in 1977. The next year he released his second album, titled The Reggie Knighton Band produced by the acclaimed record producer Roy Thomas Baker. It was a group affair this time and he brought in the other members. Knighton had been friends for a long time with guitarist Brian Ray. Ray was Knighton's age, grew up in the same part of L.A. and they formed the nucleus of the band. Knighton had just finished a tour backing another CBS artist, Valerie Carter. It was on his gig as a guitarist for Carter that he played and became friends with bassist Kurtis Teel. So the three of them held auditions for drummers, which was how they connected with Glenn Symmonds, who was replaced at the end of the bands run by Milton Ruth. The band toured as the opening act for 10cc during 1978. Knighton and the group collaborated with John Sebastian on a Canadian animated film score called "The Devil & Daniel Mouse" in 1979.

In 1981, he worked with Mark Saffan & The Keepers and added his vocals to Phil Brown’s The Jimi Project album in 2006.

Discography

Singles

Albums

References 

American rock songwriters
American rock singers
Singer-songwriters from California
American male guitarists
American folk guitarists
American rock guitarists
Living people
1953 births
People from Biloxi, Mississippi
Singer-songwriters from Mississippi
Guitarists from California
Guitarists from Mississippi
20th-century American guitarists
20th-century American male musicians
American male singer-songwriters